Marcus Hesse (born 22 March 1984 in Dresden) is a German former professional footballer who played as a goalkeeper.

References

External links
 

1984 births
Living people
German footballers
Association football goalkeepers
Bundesliga players
Regionalliga players
Alemannia Aachen players
Dynamo Dresden players
Footballers from Dresden